Clayton McCullough (born December 27, 1979) is an American professional baseball coach and former minor league baseball catcher. He is the first base coach for the Los Angeles Dodgers of Major League Baseball.

Career
McCullough played at Rose High School in Greenville, North Carolina. He was drafted by the Seattle Mariners in the 47th round of the 1998 MLB Draft but did not sign and played college baseball at East Carolina University instead. During his collegiate career for the Pirates, he batted .272 with 11 home runs and 82 RBI and earned second team All-Colonial Athletic Association honors as a Junior as well as making a couple of All-Regional teams in three appearances in the NCAA baseball tournament. 

McCullough was drafted by the Cleveland Indians in the 22nd round of the 2002 MLB Draft. He played in the Indians minor league system through 2005, playing for the Burlington Indians in 2002, Lake County Captains in 2003, Lake County and the Kinston Indians in 2004, Kinston, Akron Aeros and Buffalo Bisons in 2005. In 104 games, he had a batting average of .197 with one home run and 25 RBI.

After one season as a volunteer assistant coach for East Carolina, McCullough served as a manager in Minor League Baseball for the Toronto Blue Jays organization from 2007 to 2014, working in the Rookie and Class-A leagues and compiling a record of 629–559. before being hired by the Dodgers as their Minor League Field Coordinator. The Dodgers named McCullough their Major League first base coach for the 2021 season.

References

External links

1979 births
Living people
East Carolina Pirates baseball players
Minor league baseball players
Baseball catchers
Burlington Indians players (1986–2006)
Lake County Captains players
Kinston Indians players
Akron Aeros players
Buffalo Bisons (minor league) players
Minor league baseball managers
Los Angeles Dodgers coaches
Major League Baseball first base coaches